The TNCA Serie E was a family of various monoplanes built in Mexico by the Talleres Nacionales de Construcciones Aeronáuticas (National Aeronautical Construction Workshops).

Design and development
The first aircraft of the Serie E family was a low-wing monoplane with registration number 2-E-98, which was dubbed "Sonora", this airplane made its first flight on March 2, 1922. It was powered by a  le Rhône 9J 9-cylinder rotary engine, exceeding expectations, with performance significantly higher than similar aircraft at the time. Despite its benefits, the plane was not produced in series, because for was the Technical Consultant of the Aviation Department Ralph O'Neill, the aircraft could not be used for military purposes. The "Sonora" was in service with the Mexican Air Force until 1925 and later dismantled, being sold to a private individual.

Ángel Lascurain and Antonio Sea made a redesign of the "Sonora", this time it was a high-wing monoplane that received the registration 3-E-130 and was nicknamed "Tololoche", which made its first flight at the end of March 1923. The "Tololoche" was powered by a 160-horsepower Le Rhône 18E air-cooled 18-cylinder rotary engine in 2 rows, also it had two machine guns synchronized with the propeller. Fuselage was made in a monocoque structure covered entirely in wood. Wings were semi-rigid covered with plywood, which were easy to disassemble by using two pins.

In June 1923, a prototype similar to the "Tololoche" was built but with larger dimensions, which received the registration 4-E-131 and was nicknamed "Quetzalcóatl" or "Tololoche grande" because of its great resemblance to the "Tololoche". The "Quetzlcóatl" was powered by a  BMW IIIa 6-cylinder water-cooled  in-line engine and its fuselage was mostly built of wood. Four "Quetzlcóatl" were built, participating in observation and bombing flights during the Delahuertista rebellion.

Another prototype that was built almost simultaneously with the "Quetzalcoatl", received the registration 5-E-132, which was nicknamed "Mexico", this airplane had two seats side by side and was powered by an  le Rhône engine. It had his first flight on 21 August 1923.

Variants
Serie E "Sonora"
Low-wing monoplane, it was the first version of the Serie E and was built only a single example driven by a 110 horsepower Le Rhône 9J engine. It received the registration 2-E-98.
Serie E "Tololoche"
High-wing monoplane used as a single-seat fighter, powered by a 160-horsepower Le Rhône 18E engine, It had 2 machine gun synchronized with the propeller. The only example received the registration number 3-E-130.
Serie E "Quetzalcóatl"
(Also called "Tololoche grande") similar to the Tololoche but with enlarged dimensions, it was powered by a 185 horsepower BMW IIIa engine. Four examples were built.
Serie E "México"
Version with side-by-side seats ("Sonora" and "Quetzalcoatl" had tandem configuration) powered by an 80 horsepower Le Rhône 9C engine. It was made only one example which received the registration 5-E-132.

Specifications (variant specified)

References

See also 
TNCA Serie A

1920s Mexican military aircraft
Single-engined tractor aircraft
Aircraft manufactured in Mexico